DID: Battle Of The Champions or Dance India Dance Season 7 is the seventh season of Dance India Dance that premiered on 22 June 2019 with a unique concept.

Judges
Kareena kapoor
, Bosco martes & 
Raftaar

Top 5 Finalists









WINNER OF THE WEEK

See also
Dance India Dance
Dance Deewane
Super Dancer
Dance Bangla Dance

References

External links
Dance India Dance Battle Of The Champions on Zee5

Dance India Dance
2019 Indian television seasons
Zee TV original programming
Hindi-language television shows